Live at the Village Vanguard is a live album by Paul Motian's Trio 2000 + Two recorded at the Village Vanguard and released on the German Winter & Winter label in 2007. It features Motian’s trio with tenor saxophonist Chris Potter and double bassist Larry Grenadier, along with guests Masabumi Kikuchi on piano, and alto saxophonist Greg Osby.

Reception
The Allmusic review by Ken Dryden awarded the album 4½ stars, stating, "This is easily some of Paul Motian's most challenging music as a leader, while the Village Vanguard audience was obviously transfixed with the performances, as they remain very quiet to soak in every nuance of them".

Track listing
All compositions by Paul Motian except as indicated
 "Standard Time" - 13:40 
 "If You Could See Me Now" (Tadd Dameron) - 12:25 
 "Olivia's Dream" - 10:02 
 "Morrock" - 8:04 
 "Last Call" - 12:35 
Recorded at the Village Vanguard in New York City on December 8–10, 2006

Personnel
Paul Motian - drums
Chris Potter - tenor saxophone
Greg Osby -  alto saxophone
Masabumi Kikuchi - piano
Larry Grenadier - bass

References 

2007 live albums
Paul Motian live albums
Winter & Winter Records live albums
Albums recorded at the Village Vanguard